Raj Brar (3 January 1972 – 31 December 2016) was an Indian singer, actor, lyricist and music director who worked in Punjabi cinema. He was best known for his 2008 hit album Rebirth. He made his acting debut in the 2010 film Jawani Zindabaad,  and  he had just completed the shooting of the last movie Aam Aadmi before his death, which was released in 2018. Raj Brar died on 31 December 2016 aged 44.

Filmography

Special Notes 
After the death of Raj Brar, many songs were left unreleased. So, Bunty Bains & his daughter Sweetaj Brar decided to release that songs. One of the unreleased songs is Chandigarh Dropouts which will be released in July 2021.

References

1969 births
2016 deaths
Indian male singers
Indian male film actors
Punjabi-language singers
Male actors in Punjabi cinema